Muhammad ibn Khvandshah ibn Mahmud, more commonly known as Mirkhvand (also transliterated as Mirkhwand; 1433/34 – 1498), was a Persian historian active during the reign of the Timurid ruler Sultan Husayn Bayqara.

Life
He was the son of Burhan al-Din Khvandshah (died 1466/7), who was a disciple of the Sufi shaykh Baha al-Din Umar Jaghara'i (died 1453) in the city of Herat, where Mirkhvand's family had distinguished themselves.

Mirkhvand wrote under the patronage of Ali-Shir Nava'i (died 1501), an important counselor of Husayn Bayqara and advocate of arts and literature. Mirkhvand enjoyed good relations with Nava'i, as indicated of Mirkhvand's description of the latter in his universal history  ("The garden of purity"), as well as the positive account of Mirkhvand in Nava'i's biographical dictionary  ("The assemblies of rare talents"). Using the Timurid history book  of Abd al-Razzaq Samarqandi (died 1482) as his cornerstone, Mirkhvand started writing his  in 1474/5. Mirkhvand spent many years in the Ilkhlasiyya , a house for Sufis erected by Nava'i in 1483. Towards the end of his life, he lived for a year at the shrine of the prominent Hanbali and Sufi scholar Khwaja Abdullah Ansari (died 1088), near Herat. Mirkhvand died in Herat on 22 June 1498, and was buried in the shrine of Baha al-Din Umar Jaghara'i, the same place as his father.

The final volume and the epilogue were incomplete at the time of Mirkhvand's death, and were later completed by Khvandamir. Mirkhvand's discussion on the advantages of studying history was copied and modified by three other distinguished historians; Qasim Beg Hayati Tabrizi's  (1554); Hossein Nishapuri Vuqu'i's  (1591/2); and Sharaf Khan Bidlisi's  (1596). Mirkhvand's work attracted much attention, as demonstrated by its numerous translations, such as the Ottoman  dedicated by Mustafa ibn Hasanshah to the Ottoman grand vizier Rüstem Pasha (d. 1561) in 1550 and  written by Mehmed Kemal Balatzade in 1555. The  was one of the three works generally read by history students in Mughal India.

However, neither the current editions by Parviz (1959/60) and Kiyanfar (2001) nor the 19th-century lithographs are based on the oldest version of the books. The  was frequently used by western orientalists from the 17th to the 19th-century to understand the history of Iran. As a result, there are numerous incomplete translations of it in European languages.

References

Sources
 
 
 
 
 
 
 
 
 

1433 births
1498 deaths
15th-century Iranian historians
Historians from the Timurid Empire
People from Bukhara